"Shout and Deliver" is a song by The Reels, which was released as a single from their second album Quasimodo's Dream in March 1981. The single peaked at number 43 on the Australian charts.

Reviewed at the time of release, Roadrunner described the song as "another steaming slice of mutated pop from the most under-rated band in the land. Consists of a six-line chorus sung a number of times over a heavy drumbeat and lazy keyboard pattern. Annoying insistent and very clever."

Track listing
 Shout and Deliver – 2:42
 Depression – 3:01

References

The Reels - Shout and Deliver at discogs.com

1981 singles
The Reels songs
1981 songs
PolyGram singles